Bolko II of Ziębice (1 February 1300 – 11 June 1341) was a Duke of Jawor-Lwówek-Świdnica-Ziębice in Poland from 1301 to 1312 (with his brothers as co-rulers), of Świdnica-Ziębice from 1312 to 1322 (with his brother as co-ruler), and sole Duke of Ziębice from 1322 until his death.

He was the fourth son of Bolko I the Strict, Duke of Jawor-Lwówek-Świdnica-Ziębice, by his wife Beatrix, daughter of Otto V the Long, Margrave of Brandenburg-Salzwedel. He was named after his eldest brother Bolko, who died on 30 January 1300, just two days before his birth.

Life
At the time of his father's death in 1301, Bolko II was not quite two years old. Therefore, he and his siblings were placed under the care of their mother and the guardianship of their maternal uncle, Herman, Margrave of Brandenburg-Salzwedel, until 1305, when the eldest living brother Bernard assumed the government and the tutelage of his brothers. Out of fear that the duchy would be fragmented, Bolko II was initially destined for a career in the Church.  Bolko II strongly resisted these plans, and in 1322 received the district of Ziębice as an independent duchy from Bernard.

In 1322, Bolko II, alongside Bernard, took part with Teutonic Knights in the expedition against Lithuania.

On the threshold of his reign, Bolko II fell into conflict with the Church. In 1329, the Duke attacked the suite of the Papal legate Pietro di Alverni. This action motivated the intervention of the Kings of Poland and Bohemia, with the support of almost all of the Silesian dukes. Defeated, Bolko II was excommunicated by the Bishop of Wrocław, Nanker. The excommunication was only removed after Bolko II paid large sums to both the Papal legate and the monasteries as compensation.

In 1335, the Duchy of Ziębice was attacked by Charles of Luxembourg, Margrave of Moravia and heir of the Bohemian Kingdom, because Bolko II refused to pay homage for his duchy. It was the shortest route between Prague and the most important Silesian city, Wrocław, at that time under the control of the Bohemian Kingdom. Charles ignored Bolko II's determination, and sent a small force against him. The Duke quickly defeated the force, capturing 150 of the major Bohemian knights, but he failed to halt the destruction of the Bohemian lands made by Charles's army. Bolko II was able to take advantage from the captivity of the Bohemian knights; however, he only asked a very small ransom for them.  Bolko II won the 1335 war.

However, in June 1336, Bolko II voluntary paid homage to the King of Bohemia. The withdrawal of the Silesian Dukes by King Casimir III the Great of Poland eliminated Bolko II's hope of building an effective power against the Bohemian Kingdom. Also, Bolko II received the district of Kłodzko during his lifetime. Bolko II's act of homage confirmed that, after the eventual extinction of the male line of the Dukes of Ziębice, the Duchy would fall under the direct rule of the King of Bohemia.

Bolko II struggled with his continuing financial problems, increased by his prodigality. In 1337, he was forced to pledge Ząbkowice to Charles of Luxembourg, and shortly after, for the amount of 2,300 fines he pledged Strzelin and Kąty Wrocławskie. At the end, Bolko II only retained the capital of the Duchy, Ziębice. Despite this, Bolko II cared about the economic development of his estate, which enjoyed a relatively high popularity among the Silesian cities.

Marriage and issue
By 21 November 1321, Bolko II married Bonne de Savoie (also named Guta or Judith), daughter (either legitimate) or illegitimate
of Louis II of Savoy, Baron of Vaud. Bonne was the widow of Matthew IV Csák, a Hungarian nobleman (son of the infamous oligarch Matthew III Csák) and also mother of two sons, Matthew V and James. Bolko II and Guta had two children:
Nicholas the Small (b. c. 1327 – d. 23 April 1358).
Margareta (b. c. 1330 – d. August aft. 1368), a nun in Strzelin.

Ancestry

References

External links
BOLKO II ZIĘBICKI

|-

|-

|-

1300 births
1341 deaths
People temporarily excommunicated by the Catholic Church
Piast dynasty